Pearl (subtitled An X-traordinary Origin Story) is a 2022 slasher film directed by Ti West, co-written by West and Mia Goth, who reprises her role as the title character, and featuring David Corenswet, Tandi Wright, Matthew Sunderland, and Emma Jenkins-Purro in supporting roles. A prequel to X (2022) and the second installment in the X film series, it serves as an origin story for the title villain, whose fervent aspiration to become a movie star led her to committing violent acts on her family's Texas homestead in 1918. 

Pearl had its world premiere at the 79th Venice International Film Festival on September 3, 2022, and was released in theaters in the United States on September 16, 2022, by A24. The film grossed over $9 million and received positive reviews from critics who lauded Goth's performance, West's screenplay & direction and its homages to the films of the Golden Age of Hollywood—particularly The Wizard of Oz (1939) and Mary Poppins (1964). 

Another film in the series, a sequel to X titled MaXXXine, is currently in development.

Plot
In 1918 during the influenza pandemic, Pearl is a young woman living with her German immigrant parents on their Texas homestead while her husband, Howard, serves in World War I. Pearl's father is infirm and paralyzed, and her domineering mother, Ruth, insists that she help care for both him and the farm. Pearl, longing for a more exciting life, is captivated by the films she sees at the local cinema and aspires to become a chorus girl, much to Ruth's disapproval. However, Pearl also shows signs of being a disturbed individual; for example, she kills farm animals and physically abuses her father. 

At the movie theater, Pearl meets a young projectionist who takes a liking to her. While riding her bicycle home, Pearl stops along a cornfield and begins dancing with a scarecrow, fantasizing about the projectionist, and masturbates with it. When her mother realizes that eight cents are missing from an errand Pearl did, Pearl is berated about being careless and has her supper withheld.

Pearl's affluent sister-in-law, Mitsy, tells her of an audition being held to find new dancers for a traveling troupe, which Pearl envisions as a way out of her circumstance. She later sneaks out of the house at night and visits the projectionist, who shows her A Free Ride, an illicit stag film he acquired in France. He encourages Pearl to pursue her dreams. Pearl comments that she cannot abandon her family, and that she wishes "they would just die."

When Ruth finds a program Pearl took from the movie theater, the two get into a fierce argument over dinner. A physical altercation erupts, during which Pearl shoves her mother against the kitchen hearth, igniting her dress and resulting in Ruth suffering life-threatening burns. Pearl drags Ruth into the basement and leaves her father seated in the kitchen. She flees to the movie theater, where she has sex with the projectionist.

In the morning, the projectionist drives Pearl back to the farm so she can prepare for the audition. He is perturbed by a now maggot-infested roasted pig Mitsy's mother left for Ruth the day prior, and by inconsistencies Pearl has told him, as well as by her theatrical behavior. When he attempts to leave, Pearl flies into a fit of rage at his abandonment of her, and stabs him to death with a pitchfork before pushing his car—with his corpse in it—into a pond, where an alligator she has nicknamed Theda eats his remains. Pearl dresses herself in one of Ruth's lavish gowns, and dresses up her father before smothering him to death.

Pearl arrives at the church where the audition is being held. She gives a dance performance she feels will win over the talent scouts, but is devastated when she is rejected for not being young, blonde, or "all-American". Mitsy accompanies her home in an attempt to console her. In the kitchen, Pearl makes a lengthy confession to Mitsy about her resentment toward Howard, who came from a privileged background but insisted that the couple remain on her family's farm, and admits she was relieved when she miscarried his child. She further confesses her feelings of alienation and insecurity, her joy in acts of harm, and to taking the lives of her parents and the projectionist. Pearl then manipulates a stunned Mitsy into confessing that she won the audition over Pearl. Jealous that Mitsy won the audition, Pearl chases her down the driveway and kills her with an axe.

Pearl dismembers Mitsy's body and feeds her corpse to Theda, before going into the basement and lying with a deceased Ruth. Concluding that her mother was correct and that Pearl should "make the best of what she has", she decides to remediate her wrongdoings by creating a comfortable home for Howard when he returns from the war. The next morning, Howard arrives unexpectedly. In the kitchen, he is horrified to find the bodies of Pearl's parents seated at the dining table around the rotting pig. Pearl greets him with a protracted, pained smile.

Cast
 Mia Goth as Pearl
 David Corenswet as the projectionist
 Tandi Wright as Ruth
 Matthew Sunderland as Pearl's father
 Emma Jenkins-Purro as Mitsy
 Alistair Sewell as Howard

Production

Development
Ti West began writing a script for the prequel film during production on X. He stated that the prequel project had developed from a story he had collaborated on with Mia Goth, and that he had seen it either as becoming a potential film, or simply serving as a backstory for Goth's role as Pearl in the first movie. After the onset of the coronavirus pandemic, seeing its impact on the cinema industry, West stated that he had been inspired to continue working and had decided to begin production of the prequel immediately after wrapping on the previous installment. West stated that he had pitched his idea of a new franchise to A24 and had been surprised when they green-lit his projects. The filmmaker stated that he intends each film to have its own distinct style and genre of horror. Describing his approach to X, he said he was heavily influenced by The Texas Chainsaw Massacre franchise and by the works of Mario Bava, which explore how the rise of independent filmmaking affected society. Regarding Pearl, he described it as Douglas Sirk melodrama meeting the Technicolor style of Mary Poppins and The Wizard of Oz, made as a "demented Disney movie", and said it will explore how Hollywood filmmaking has influenced people. West stated that he intends to continue this trend of exploring diverse styles and genres in future installments. The movie is a joint-venture production between A24 and Little Lamb Productions.

With the release of the first publicity poster, it was announced that West would once again serve as film editor alongside his other production roles, that Eliot Rockett would return as cinematographer, and that Tyler Bates and Tim Williams would serve as co-composers of the film's score.

Casting
Mia Goth reprises her role as a younger version of Pearl, the elderly woman from the first film. In July 2022, it was revealed that David Corenswet, Tandi Wright, Matthew Sunderland, and Emma Jenkins-Purro will feature as the supporting cast.

Filming
Principal photography was revealed to have begun in secret immediately following the completed photography on X. Filming started in New Zealand, took place back-to-back with the first movie and used the same sets that were built for X. West worked with the production crew of Avatar: The Way of Water, who were taking a break from production on that film at the time. West stated that, despite the production taking place during the COVID-19 pandemic, the production crew had already completed their required period of self-isolation, and were therefore able to work safely and efficiently together during the pandemic. He said: "I came out of quarantine and I was like, 'We're already building all of this stuff, it's COVID and we're on the one place on Earth where it's safe to make a movie.'"

Post-production
In March 2022, having completed filming, West announced that he was currently working on editing the movie, that he would go to Nashville, Tennessee, following the March 2022 SXSW Film Festival, to record the orchestral score for the soundtrack with Tyler Bates and Timothy Williams, and that the film was expected to be finished in May.

Marketing
A teaser trailer was screened at the SXSW Film Festival, following screening of the first film. The footage accompanied the theatrical release of X. In July 2022, the first trailer was released with the marketing tagline of "an X-traordinary Origin Story", referring to the previous installment.

Release
Pearl had its world premiere at the 79th Venice International Film Festival on September 3, 2022, and was released in theaters in the United States on September 16, 2022.

The film was released on VOD on October 25, 2022, and was released on Blu-ray and DVD on November 15, 2022.

Reception

Box office 
In the United States and Canada, Pearl was released alongside The Woman King and See How They Run, and was projected to gross around $4 million from 2,900 theaters in its opening weekend. The film made $1.3 million on its first day and went on to debut to $3.1 million, finishing third at the box office. It made $1.92 million in its second weekend, finishing fifth at the box office.

Critical response 
On Rotten Tomatoes, the film holds an approval rating of 91% based on 162 reviews, with an average rating of 7.7/10. The site's consensus states: "Pearl finds Ti West squeezing fresh gore out of the world he created with X – and once again benefiting from a brilliant Mia Goth performance." On Metacritic, the film has a weighted average score of 73 out of 100 based on reviews from 31 critics, indicating "generally favorable reviews". Audiences polled by CinemaScore gave the film an average grade of "B–" on an A+ to F scale, while those at PostTrak gave the film a 75% overall positive score, with 54% saying they would definitely recommend it.

Reviewing the film following its Venice Film Festival premiere, Peter Bradshaw of The Guardian praised West's direction and Goth's "grandiose performance", assigning it a perfect rating of five stars and remarking: "Perhaps I shouldn't have enjoyed Pearl as much as I did: but it's clever, limber, gruesome and brutally well acted. A gem." In his review for The Hollywood Reporter, David Rooney described it as a "cleverly packaged pandemic production with narrative echoes of that global anxiety", praising the screenplay, cinematography, score, and Goth's performance—which he compares to that of American actress Shelley Duvall in The Shining (1980). In a year-end retrospective for Daily Grindhouse, Preston Fassel named the film as the best horror movie of 2022 as well as "the best film of the year, period, and a bona fide cinematic classic that deserves Criterion status ASAP." In a negative review, Ewan Gleadow of Cult Following wrote that while West "doubles down on what made X such a chilling feature and consolidates what he is good at", the film ultimately "feels like a weak parody of the MGM days of The Wizard of Oz."

Filmmaker Martin Scorsese was reportedly very impressed by the film, calling it "mesmerizing" and stating that it was "powered by a pure, undiluted love for cinema". The New York Times named the character of Pearl one of the 93 most stylish "people" of 2022, highlighting her "her blood red dress, lacy blue bow, smudged makeup, boots … and ax".

Accolades

Future
West announced in March 2022 that he was working on the script for a third movie in the film series, to be set chronologically after the events of X. That project will explore another subgenre of horror and will continue depicting how cinema in general, and the development of home video releases in particular, have influenced society. West stated that, while a viewer can watch each movie independently without having seen the previous film, they are made to "complement each other". In describing his creative processes during the development of these films, West stated, "I'm trying to build a world out of all this, like people do these days." The filmmaker further noted, "You can't make a slasher movie without a bunch of sequels".

In September 2022, at the first Midnight Madness showing of Pearl for the 2022 Toronto International Film Festival, a third film was officially announced with a short teaser played after the credits. The clip was later released online for those not present at the event. West once again serves as writer/director and one of the producers, while Mia Goth will reprise her role from the first movie. Serving as a sequel to X, the film takes place in 1985 and is titled MaXXXine. The plot was confirmed to center around Maxine, the only survivor of the "Massacre of X" as she continues to pursue her future in Hollywood. Though principal photography has not yet begun, the teaser trailer was shot with the film fast-tracked to being green-lit by A24, following the successes of the previous two installments. Jacob Jaffke, Kevin Turen, and Harrison Kreiss will be producers, while Goth will additionally serve as an executive producer.

References

External links
 
 
 
 
 

2022 horror films
2020s American films
2020s English-language films
2020s psychological horror films
2020s slasher films
A24 (company) films
2022 independent films
American prequel films
American psychological horror films
American slasher films
Films about farmers
Films about sexual repression
Films directed by Ti West
Films impacted by the COVID-19 pandemic
Films scored by Tyler Bates
Films set in 1918
Films set on farms
Films set in Texas
Films shot in New Zealand
Mad Solar productions
Matricide in fiction
Patricide in fiction